Kaiapoi High School is a state co-educational secondary school located in Kaiapoi, in the Waimakariri District of New Zealand's South Island. The school serves  students from Years 9 to 13 (approx. ages 12 to 18) as of

History
The Kaiapoi Borough Council first approached the government about establishing a school in the town in 1954. The Department of Education approved the purchase of the  site on Ohoka Road in September 1961.

The school opened in February 1972. Like many New Zealand state secondary schools built in the 1970s, Kaiapoi High School was built to the S68 standard design, characterised by single-storey classroom blocks of masonry construction, low-pitched roofs with protruding clerestory windows, and internal open courtyards. Other schools using this design in the wider Canterbury area include Hornby High School and Ashburton College.

Enrolment
Kaiapoi High School serves the coastal Waimakariri District, including the towns of Kaiapoi, Woodend, Pegasus, Waikuku, and the surrounding rural area west to Swannanoa. It also serves the rural northeastern part of Christchurch City as far south as the Styx River, including Kainga, Brooklands, Spencerville.

At the April 2014 Education Review Office (ERO) review of the school, Kaiapoi High School had 587 students, including 24 international students. There were slightly more male students (51%) than female students. 79% of students identified as New Zealand European (Pākehā), 14% identified as Māori, and 7% identified as another ethnicity.

Kaiapoi High School has a socio-economic decile of 7 (funding step O), meaning it draws its school community from areas of moderately-low socio-economic disadvantage when compared to other New Zealand schools. This changed from decile 5 (funding step M) at the beginning of 2015, as part of the nationwide review of deciles following the following the 2013 census.

Karanga Mai Young Parents' College
Karanga Mai Young Parents' College is a teen parent unit attached to Kaiapoi High School designed to assist teenage parents (and expectant parents) in gaining a secondary school education. Opened in 1992, it was the first teen parent unit in the South Island, and only the second unit in New Zealand.

Notable alumni

References

External links
School website
Education Review Office (ERO) reports for Kaiapoi High School
Education Review Office (ERO) reports for Karanga Mai Young Parents' College

Secondary schools in Canterbury, New Zealand
Educational institutions established in 1972
New Zealand secondary schools of S68 plan construction
1972 establishments in New Zealand
Kaiapoi